Opus Festival (Hebrew: פסטיבל אופוס) is a prominent festival of classical music held annually in Israel. Since year 2014, it has attracted renowned soloists such as Emmanuel Pahud, Kolja Blacher, Radek Baborak, Guy Braunstein, Vadim Gluzman, Winds of the Berlin Philharmonic among others.

Most of its concerts are broadcast live on the Israeli Broadcasting Corporation's Kol Ha Musica. Its programs include symphonic and chamber music as well as recitals. The majority of its concerts are held at the Henry Crown Hall in Jerusalem and the Tel Aviv Museum of Art. Opus Festival is also nurturing promising young musicians and holds masterclasses at the Buchmann-Mehta School of Music.

Artists 
Past concerts featured soloists of the Berlin Philharmonic and La Scala opera house.

Violin
 Guy Braunstein
 Vadim Gluzman
 Shlomo Mintz
 Kolja Blacher
Piano
 Boris Giltburg
 Yuja Wang
Oera singers
 Laura Claycomb
 Yaniv d'Or
Flute
 Emmanuel Pahud
Horn
 Radek Baborák
In 2016, Opus held a special concert with violins and celli that survived the holocaust, from Amnon and Avshalom Weinstein's collection

References

External links
 
 
 Radek Baborak's encore, 22.4.2017 Opus Festival, Tel Aviv Museum of Art

Festivals in Jerusalem
Spring festivals
Tourist attractions in Jerusalem
Annual events in Israel
Classical music festivals in Israel
Opera festivals